Chimtal District also Chemtal or Chamtal is a district located in the western part of Balkh province, Afghanistan. The estimated population of Chimtal in 2004 was around 81,311, with Pashtuns being predominant. The capital is Chimtal.

References

External links
 Map of Settlements iMMAP, September 2011

Districts of Balkh Province